"Thavakalai" Chittibabu also known as "Thavakalai" (1975 – 2017) was an Indian actor and comedian who appeared in South Indian language films. He has acted in over 500 films in Tamil, Telugu, Malayalam, Kannada, Hindi and Sinhala.

Early life 
His mother tongue is Tamil. His hometown is Tamil Nadu, Chennai district. He has great dance skills, a glimpse of which can be seen in the movie “Adhisaya Piravi” starring Rajinikanth. His mother's name is Subbulakshmi and his father's name is Vijayakumar. He was also an actor. He has acted in about 20 films in Group Dance in Tamil and Telugu before coming to act mundhanai mudichu.

Film career 
His father was the co-star agent of poi satchi film, he went to Arunachalam Studios one day with his father while filming. It was then that actor Kullamani introduced him to actor Bhagyaraj. Director K. bhagyaraj remembers thavakalai he had always seen in Chennai and chose the film 'Mundhanai mudichu'. Took him to AVM. He took her to the Gopichettipalayam. After the release of the film, the boy became very busy. He participated in the inaugural, introductory and complimentary ceremonies. He became a big fan of many stage shows in one year. He also acted in a few Telugu films such as Nenu Maavite Sampangala (1981) before he started acting in Tamil films.

Television career 
He also acted many in Tamil television serials. he has acted in Maya Machhindra serial in vijay television.

Death 
He lived in Vadapalani, Chennai. He had a heart attack and died on 26 February 2017 at his home.

Filmography 
This is a partial filmography. You can expand it.

References 

1975 births
2017 deaths
Indian male film actors
Male actors in Tamil cinema
Indian male comedians
Tamil comedians